Donald Stark (2 May 1930 – 29 January 2019) was a New Zealand cricketer. He played in two first-class matches for Canterbury in 1953/54.

See also
 List of Canterbury representative cricketers

References

External links
 

1930 births
2019 deaths
New Zealand cricketers
Canterbury cricketers
Cricketers from Christchurch